KSDC may refer to:

 Kuki State Demand Committee
 KSDC, the ICAO airport code for Williamson-Sodus Airport in New York State
 KSDC-LP, a low-powered radio station in Centralia, Missouri
 Kentucky State Data Center